An election was held on November 6, 2018 to elect all 100 members to Montana's House of Representatives. The election coincided with the elections for other offices, including the U.S Senate, U.S. House of Representatives, and state senate. The primary election was held on June 5, 2018.

Results Summary

Incumbents defeated in the general election
Jeremy Trebas (R-District 25), defeated by Jasmine Krotkov (D)
Adam Hertz (R-District 96), defeated by Tom Winter (D)

Open seats that changed parties
Tom Jacobson (D-District 21) ran for the Montana Senate, seat won by Ed Buttrey (R)
Jon Knokey (R-District 65) didn't seek re-election, seat won by Christopher Pope (D)
John Fleming (D-District 93) didn't seek re-election, seat won by Joe Read (R)

Detailed Results

Districts 1-20

District 1
Incumbent Republican Steve Gunderson has represented the 1st District since 2017.

District 2
Incumbent Republican Mike Cuffe has represented the 2nd district since 2011. Cuffe was term-limited and successfully ran for a seat in the Montana Senate.

District 3
Incumbent Democrat Zac Perry has represented the 3rd district since 2015.

District 4
Incumbent Republican Matt Regier has represented the 4th district since 2017.

District 5
Incumbent Democrat Dave Fern has represented the 5th district since 2017.

District 6
Incumbent Republican Carl Glimm has represented the 6th district since 2013.

District 7
Incumbent Republican Frank Garner has represented the 7th district since 2015.

District 8
Incumbent Republican Steve Lavin has represented the 8th district since 2011. Lavin was term-limited and couldn't seek re-election.

District 9
Incumbent Republican Randy Brodehl has represented the 9th district and its predecessors since 2011. Brodehl was term-limited and couldn't seek re-election.

District 10
Incumbent Republican Mark Noland has represented the 10th district since 2015.

District 11
Incumbent Republican Derek Skees has represented the 11th district since 2017.

District 12
Incumbent Republican House Speaker Pro Tempore Greg Hertz has represented the 12th district since 2015.

District 13
Incumbent Republican Bob Brown has represented the 13th district since 2015.

District 14
Incumbent Republican Denley Loge has represented the 14th district since 2017.

District 15
Incumbent Democrat George Kipp III has represented the 15th district since 2015. Kipp didn't seek re-election.

District 16
Incumbent Democrat Susan Webber has represented the 16th district since 2015. Webber successfully ran for a seat in the Montana Senate.

District 17
Incumbent Republican Ross Fitzgerald has represented the 17th district since 2017.

District 18
Incumbent Republican Rob Cook has represented the 18th district since 2011. Cook was term-limited and he unsuccessfully ran for a seat on the Montana Public Service Commission. State Senator Llew Jones won the open seat.

District 19
Incumbent Republican Wendy McKamey has represented the 19th district since 2017.

District 20
Incumbent Republican Fred Anderson has represented the 20th district since 2017.

Districts 21-40

District 21
Incumbent Democrat Tom Jacobson has represented the 21st district since 2013. Jacobson ran successfully for a seat in the Montana Senate. Republican State Senator Ed Buttrey won the open seat.

District 22
Incumbent Republican Lola Sheldon-Galloway has represented the 22nd district since 2017.

District 23
Incumbent Democrat Brad Hamlett has represented the 23rd district since 2017.

District 24
Incumbent Democrat Jean Price has represented the 24th district and its predecessors since 2011. Price was term-limited and couldn't seek re-election.

District 25
Incumbent  Republican Jeremy Trebas has represented the 25th district since 2017. Trebas lost re-election to Democrat Jasmine Krotkov.

District 26
Incumbent Democrat Casey Schreiner has represented the 26th district and its predecessors since 2013.

District 27
Incumbent Republican Jim O'Hara has represented the 27th district since 2017. O'Hara didn't seek re-election.

District 28
Incumbent Democrat Jacob Bachmeier has represented the 28th district since 2017.

District 29
Incumbent Republican Dan Bartel has represented the 29th district since 2017.

District 30
Incumbent Republican Wylie Galt has represented the 30th district since 2017.

District 31
Incumbent Democrat Bridget Smith has represented the 31st district since 2013.

District 32
Incumbent Democrat Jonathan Windy Boy has represented the 32nd district since 2017.

District 33
Incumbent Republican Casey Knudsen has represented the 33rd district since 2017.

District 34
Incumbent Republican House Speaker Austin Knudsen has represented the 34th district since 2011. Knudsen was term-limited and couldn't seek re-election.

District 35
Incumbent Republican Scott Staffanson has represented the 35th district since 2013. Staffanson didn't seek re-election.

District 36
Incumbent Republican Alan Doane has represented the 36th district since 2013.

District 37
Incumbent Republican Bill Harris has represented the 37th district and its predecessors since 2011. Harris was term-limited and couldn't seek re-election. State Senator Eric Moore won the open seat.

District 38
Incumbent Republican Kenneth Holmlund has represented the 38th district since 2015.

District 39
Incumbent Republican Geraldine Custer has represented the 39th district since 2015.

District 40
Incumbent Republican Barry Usher has represented the 40th district since 2017.

Districts 41-60

District 41
Incumbent Democrat Rae Peppers has represented the 41st district since 2013.

District 42
Incumbent Democrat Sharon Stewart-Peregoy has represented the 42nd district since 2017.

District 43
Incumbent Republican Peggy Webb has represented the 43rd district since 2017.

District 44
Incumbent Republican Dale Mortensen has represented the 44th district since 2015.

District 45
Incumbent Republican Daniel Zolnikov has represented the 45th district since 2013.

District 46
Incumbent Republican Don Jones has represented the 46th district since 2013. Jones didn't seek re-election.

District 47
Incumbent Democrat Katharin Kelker has represented the 47th district since 2015.

District 48
Incumbent Democrat Jessica Karjala has represented the 48th district since 2015.

District 49
Incumbent Democrat Emma Kerr-Carpenter has represented the 49th district since 2018. She was elected to a full term.

District 50
Incumbent Democrat Virginia Court has represented the 50th district and its predecessors since 2011. Court was term-limited and couldn't seek re-election.

District 51
Incumbent Republican Frank Fleming has represented the 51st district since 2018. Fleming was elected to a full term.

District 52
Incumbent Republican Jimmy Patelis has represented the 52nd district since 2017. Patelis didn't seek re-election.

District 53
Incumbent Republican Dennis Lenz has represented the 53rd district since 2017.

District 54
Incumbent Republican Jeff Essmann has represented the 54th district since 2015. Essmann didn't seek re-election.

District 55
Incumbent Republican Vince Ricci has represented the 55th district since 2015.

District 56
Incumbent Republican Sue Vinton has represented the 56th district since 2017.

District 57
Incumbent Republican Forrest Mandeville has represented the 57th district since 2015.

District 58
Incumbent Republican Seth Berglee has represented the 58th district since 2015.

District 59
Incumbent Republican Alan Redfield has represented the 59th district since 2013.

District 60
Incumbent Democrat Laurie Bishop has represented the 60th district since 2017.

Districts 61-80

District 61
Incumbent Democrat Jim Hamilton has represented the 61st district and its predecessors since 2017.

District 62
Incumbent Democrat Tom Woods has represented the 62nd district since 2013.

District 63
Incumbent Democrat Zach Brown has represented the 63rd district since 2015.

District 64
Incumbent Republican Kerry White has represented the 64th District since 2013.

District 65
Incumbent Republican Jon Knokey has represented the 65th district since 2017. Knokey ran for re-election, but later withdrew. Former Representative Christopher Pope won the open seat.

District 66
Incumbent Democrat Denise Hayman has represented the 66th District since 2015.

District 67
Incumbent Republican Tom Burnett has represented the 67th District since 2015.

District 68
Incumbent Republican Bruce Grubbs has represented the 68th District since 2017.

District 69
Incumbent Republican Walt Sales has represented the 69th District since 2017.

District 70
Incumbent Republican Kelly Flynn has represented the 70th District and its predecessors since 2011. Flynn was term-limited and couldn't seek re-election.

District 71
Incumbent Republican Ray Shaw has represented the 71st District since 2013.

District 72
Incumbent Republican Tom Welch has represented the 72nd District since 2017.

District 73
Incumbent Democrat Jim Keane has represented the 73rd District since 2017.

District 74
Incumbent Democrat Amanda Curtis has represented the 74th District since 2017. Curtis didn't seek re-election.

District 75
Incumbent Republican Kirk Wagoner has represented the 75th District since 2013. Wagoner didn't seek re-election.

District 76
Incumbent Democrat Ryan Lynch has represented the 76th district since 2013.

District 77 
Incumbent Democrat Kathy Swanson has represented the 79th district since 2011. Swanson was term-limited and couldn't seek re-election.

District 78
Incumbent Democrat Gordon Pierson has represented the 78th District and its predecessors since 2013.

District 79
Incumbent Democrat Minority Leader Jenny Eck has represented the 79th district since 2013. Eck initially ran for re-election, but later withdrew.

District 80
Incumbent Republican Becky Beard has represented the 80th District since 2017.

Districts 81-100

District 81
Incumbent Democrat Janet Ellis has represented the 81st District since 2015. Ellis ran successfully for a seat in the Montana Senate. State Senator Mary Cafero won the open seat.

District 82
Incumbent Democrat Moffie Funk has represented the 82nd district since 2015.

District 83
Incumbent Democrat Kim Abbott has represented the 83rd district since 2017.

District 84
Incumbent Democrat Mary Ann Dunwell has represented the 84th District since 2015.

District 85
Incumbent Republican Theresa Manzella has represented the 85th District since 2015.

District 86
Incumbent Republican Majority Leader Ron Ehli has represented the 86th District since 2011. Ehli was term-limited and couldn't seek re-election.

District 87
Incumbent Republican Nancy Ballance has represented the 87th District since 2013.

District 88
Incumbent Republican Edward Greef has represented the 88th District and its predecessors since 2011. Greef was term-limited and couldn't seek re-election.

District 89
Incumbent Democrat Dave Severson has represented the 89th District since his appointment in 2018. Severson didn't seek re-election.

District 90
Incumbent Democrat Ellie Boldman has represented the 90th District and its predecessors since 2011. Boldman was term-limited and couldn't seek re-election.

District 91
Incumbent Democrat Bryce Bennett has represented the 91st District since 2015. Bennett successfully ran for a seat in the Montana Senate.

District 92
Incumbent Republican Mike Hopkins has represented the 92nd District since 2017.

District 93
Incumbent Democrat John Fleming has represented the 93rd district since 2017. Fleming didn't seek re-election.

District 94
Incumbent Democrat Kimberly Dudik has represented the 94th District and its predecessors since 2013.

District 95
Incumbent Democrat Shane Morigeau has represented the 95th District since 2017.

District 96
Incumbent Republican Adam Hertz has represented the 96th District since 2017. Hertz lost re-election to Democrat Tom Winter.

District 97
Incumbent Republican Brad Tschida has represented the 97th district since 2015.

District 98
Incumbent Democrat Willis Curdy has represented the 98th district since 2015.

District 99
Incumbent Democrat Marilyn Ryan has represented the 99th District since 2017.

District 100
Incumbent Democrat Andrea Olsen has represented the 100th District since 2015.

References

2018 Montana elections
Montana House
November 2018 events in the United States
Montana House of Representatives elections